Metrorail is the heavy rail rapid transit system of Miami and Miami-Dade County in the U.S. state of Florida. Metrorail is operated by Miami-Dade Transit (MDT), a departmental agency of Miami-Dade County.
Metrorail serves the urban core of Miami, connecting Miami International Airport, the Health District, Downtown Miami, and Brickell with the northern developed neighborhoods of Hialeah and Medley to the northwest, and to suburban The Roads, Coconut Grove, Coral Gables, and South Miami, ending at urban Dadeland in Kendall. Metrorail connects to the Metromover in Downtown, which provides metro service to the entirety of Downtown and Brickell. Additionally, it connects to South Florida's commuter rail system at Tri-Rail station, as well as Metrobus routes at all stations.

In 2012, Metrorail opened its 23rd station, Miami International Airport station, at Miami International Airport (MIA), beginning service on a newly created 16-station Orange Line between the MIA and  stations. The new line has helped increase ridership significantly, adding millions of riders per year and allowing residents and visitors alike direct access from MIA to Downtown Miami, as well as greater connectivity between various modes of transit throughout Miami-Dade County. The station provides direct service to Tri-Rail commuter rail, Greyhound Lines intercity bus, and the Rental Car Center.

History

Construction

In 1971, the Miami Urban Area Transportation Study completed by the Dade County metropolitan planning organization recommended the construction for a rapid transit system for Greater Miami. Having experienced a prolonged post-World War II population boom, metropolitan Dade County's permanent population rose by 35% to nearly 1.3 million residents within a decade, among the fastest population growth rates in the United States. Within a year of the study, county residents approved a $132.5 million ($ million, adjusted for current inflation) bond dedicated to transit, with additional funding approved by the Florida Legislature for transit which, up until that time, operated solely on fare revenue. In 1976, with preliminary engineering completed for the system, the Federal Transit Administration (FTA, then, the Urban Mass Transit Administration) committed 80% of the costs for the first stage of rapid transit system, with the county and state incurring the remaining cost. In the end the system cost over a billion dollars.

In April 1979, the Interstate Commerce Commission ratified an agreement between the Florida East Coast Railway and Dade County to transfer the right-of-way along US 1 to Miami-Dade Transit, then named the Metro Transit Agency. Groundbreaking for the system the county commission voted to be named "Metrorail" (working name was DART - Dade Area Rapid Transit) took place at the site of what would become University station in June. Construction began in December 1980 with placing of a double-tee guideway girder near the University of Miami. The entire original  line contained 2,704 girders, constructed at a cost of $55,887,830. In June 1983, the first segment of Metrorail, 10 stations from Dadeland South to Overtown (now "Historic Overtown/Lyric Theatre") was completed with the construction of the Miami River Bridge. Revenue operation commenced on May 20, 1984, with 125,000 taking the free first-day service from Pinecrest/Dadeland to Overtown.

Additional segments between Earlington Heights and Okeechobee opened between December 1984 and May 1985. In March 1989, a temporary station was opened to provide a connection to the newly opened Tri-Rail commuter rail line, with the now permanent station officially opening in June. Preliminary engineering for a rapid transit extension to the Palmetto Expressway began in 1996 with Palmetto station opening in May 2003. As far as operational costs, revenues expected for 2006 were $17.15 million, while expenses budgeted for 2006 were $41.29 million. These historic figures became the last the Miami Dade Transit Authority ever disclosed, and are the figures still displayed on today's Miami-Dade Transit webpage as of January 2012.

With the area having a generally low density and lacking transit-oriented development, the Metrorail was designed as a park and ride system, with the idea being that suburban residents would drive to the stations, then commute the rest of the way into the city. Nearly all of the stations outside of downtown Miami have parking facilities, except Tri-Rail station. Earlington Heights, located just northwest of Downtown and adjacent to Interstate 95 and the Airport Expressway, has a large garage that was formerly dedicated to Metrorail riders. However, that is now used by the county due to the station's low ridership, with only 95 vehicle spaces currently available. The successful Dadeland garages are at or over capacity, with two of Metrorail's proposed extensions, the West Kendall Corridor and South Link, intended to help alleviate them. The two northernmost stations, which are located near the Palmetto Expressway, Palmetto and Okeechobee, appeal to Broward County commuters with nearly 2,000 combined spaces. Additionally, the proposed North Corridor to the Broward/Miami-Dade county line would have included five park and ride facilities totaling 2,650 spaces. In the late 1990s, the plan was to potentially even continue the Metrorail line into Broward County along 27th Avenue (University Drive), ending at Broward Boulevard near Broward Mall in Plantation.

Ridership growth and transit tax

After the initial segment of the single Green Line opened, Metrorail saw less than 10,000 riders per day. This increased to 15,000 after the rest of the line and stations opened in late 1984 and 1985. After running out of money due to cost overruns, the originally planned to be  system consisting of several lines was never completed, and lack of transit-oriented development along the single line led to the system being regarded as a boondoggle. President Ronald Reagan commented that, given the low number of riders, it would have been cheaper to buy them all a limousine than the billion dollar cost of building and subsidizing the system. The federal subsidy was approximately $800 million of the $1.02 billion used to fund the line. Ridership was up to 15,000 after the rest of the line had opened. Consequently, the southern nine stations from Kendall to Downtown Miami have higher ridership than the northern end. This part of the system also has a higher average speed, having fewer curves and long distances between stations as it follows the congested South Dixie Highway. During the 1990s, ridership growth was relatively stagnant, however, and Metrorail remained the subject of criticism. At this time, ridership was up to about 50,000 per day, about a quarter of the original ridership estimate.

Although the original referendum for a one-cent transit sales tax increase had failed in 1999, a half-cent sales surtax (Charter County Transit System Surtax) increase was passed by a two-to-one margin by Miami-Dade County voters in November 2002, with the intention being for the revenue to go fully towards the funding of new transit lines, including the Metrorail Orange Line, new bus routes, and increased service. As it turned out, Miami-Dade Transit was running a deficit and used some of the tax to close the books, as well as using some to hire new staff, pay rent, and buy furniture for their new headquarters at the Historic Overtown/Lyric Theatre station. By the late 2000s recession, it was realized that only the  AirportLink of the Orange Line would be funded, and after service cuts in 2008, Metrorail was running fewer trains than before the tax was passed. In response to all this, The Miami Herald published a comprehensive exposé titled "Taken For A Ride, How the transit tax went off track", detailing all of the promises that were not kept as well as what money was misspent and how. Despite the service cuts, due to the rise in energy prices and ever-increasing congestion, as well as a significant amount of residential development in the downtown area, ridership continued to grow during the 2000s, averaging well over 60,000 weekday riders throughout 2011. However, this is still short of the 1985 estimate of 75,000 daily riders that were expected by the end of that year. The transit tax also funded improvements to the adjoining Metromover system, including removal of the 25 cent fare, with the idea that higher ridership on the system would lead to higher Metrorail ridership, as well as the realization that the cost of fare collection exceeded fare revenue.

Orange Line and Airport extension

The original Metrorail line was initially planned to be built to the airport, but due to political pressure and lobbying was instead directed to its current alignment around the airport and to Hialeah. In May 2009, Miami-Dade County broke ground on the AirportLink project, a  extension of Metrorail connecting the existing Earlington Heights station to the Miami Intermodal Center (MIC), located adjacent to Miami International Airport's rental car center. The AirportLink was considered a vital component of the People's Transportation Plan (PTP), which Miami-Dade voters approved in 2002. The bulk of the funding for the $506 million project came from the plan's half-penny tax, with the Florida Department of Transportation (FDOT) contributing $101.3 million. Construction commenced in May 2009, and service on the new Orange Line began on July 28, 2012, with the project completed on time and under budget. At the MIC, the Orange Line connects to Tri-Rail, Greyhound intercity buses, and the MIA Mover, the airport's people mover.

Transit-oriented development
In addition to private development, several joint-development affordable housing projects have recently been constructed along the Metrorail line with the intent of increasing ridership through transit-oriented development. These projects include  apartments,  Transit Village, and The Beacon, which is located near Historic Overtown/Lyric Theater station in Downtown Miami. The headquarters of Miami-Dade Transit, also located next to Historic Overtown/Lyric Theater station, is known as the Overtown Transit Village. Brownsville Transit Village, opening in March 2012, was visited by the administrator of the Environmental Protection Agency (EPA), Lisa P. Jackson, on January 5, 2012, to tour the 490-unit development, which will save an estimated five million gallons of water and $50,000 annually in utility bills due to environmentally sustainable plumbing fixtures. Nonetheless, by 2016, Brownsville and Santa Clara were still the lowest ridership stations, the only ones to regularly post ridership numbers below 1,000 daily. In general, stations to the north of Civic Center see much lower ridership, on average one-third of stations from Civic Center south. They are mostly in industrial areas with low population density and little development, as well as stagnant or declining populations, such as Gladeview and Brownsville. Additionally, stations to the north of Earlington Heights are only served by one line, giving them much longer headways.

Trackage

Metrorail runs from the northwest in Medley through Hialeah, into the city of Miami, the downtown area, through Coral Gables and South Miami, and ending in southwest Miami-Dade at Dadeland Mall. There are 23 accessible Metrorail stations, one about every .

Since completion of the Airport Link in 2012, Metrorail increased its service frequency to peak headways of three and a half to five minutes on the shared portion of the line from Dadeland South to Earlington Heights.

Along with the Metrorail system, the tracks are mostly elevated. The three sections that are not are under I-95 between Vizcaya and Brickell stations, under I-95 just east of Culmer station, and the northern end of the line from just east of the Palmetto Expressway heading west into the Palmetto station and tail track. In each of these cases, the tracks ride on the ground level for a brief amount of time. The platform at each Metrorail station is long enough to accommodate six-car-long trains; the Dadeland North, Earlington Heights, and Government Center station platforms are long enough to accommodate eight-car-long trains. In-service trains are usually either four or six cars long; in the evening it is not uncommon for Miami-Dade Transit to link two out-of-service trains together before returning them to Lehman Yard. Trains are stored at the Lehman Yard just west of Okeechobee station. There are extra tracks and a new test track, known as the Lehman Center Test Track, built at the Lehman Yard.

Rolling stock

Current fleet

Metrorail currently uses 136 heavy-rail cars built by the Hitachi Rail Italy, the first of which started running in December 2017. They were constructed in a custom rail-car building facility in Medley, Florida. The cars are semi-permanently attached in married pairs, and joined up to form 4-car trains, which is the normal train length, although 6-car trains are also possible. Included amenities are free Wi-Fi, interior bicycle racks, improved announcement systems, digital signs and high-efficiency air conditioning units.

Former fleet

Metrorail formerly used 136 heavy-rail cars (known as the Universal Transit Vehicle) built by the Budd Company under the name "Transit America"; they are identical to those used on the Baltimore Metro SubwayLink (save for the modifications made to Baltimore's cars during their refurbishment between 2002 and 2005), as the two systems were built at the same time, and the two agencies were able to save money by sharing a single order. The Baltimore-Miami order was among the last orders Budd filled before shuttering its railcar manufacturing business; a fleet of similar vehicles was manufactured by Società Italiana Ernesto Breda for the Red and Purple lines of the Los Angeles Metro Rail between 1988 and 2000.

These cars were manufactured in Budd's Red Lion plant in Northeast Philadelphia in 1983. Each car can hold up to 166 passengers (76 seated, 90 standing), and draw power from an electric .

Replacement

The Miami-Dade County Government was working with the Citizens Independent Transportation Trust (CITT) to receive money from the half-penny sur-tax approved by voters in 2002 in order to purchase new Metrorail cars. MDT later planned to refurbish the existing Metrorail cars with the money instead of replacing them as promised. However, it was found that the fleet had never been maintained properly, and in 2008, a cost-benefit analysis found that, based on the current fleet's condition, a refurbishment would cost just as much as it would to buy new cars, if not more so. There were discussions with Washington, D.C.'s Metro system about combining car orders with their 6000-series cars to achieve lower costs through economies of scale, but the talks failed to work anything out.

The following year, Miami-Dade issued an RFP for new cars to replace their existing fleet, at a cost no greater than $2.419 million per car. Proposals from three railcar manufacturers were reviewed, with only two of which meeting the price requirements, these being from Italy-based AnsaldoBreda and Elmira Heights, New York-based CAF USA, an American branch of the Spain-based Construcciones y Auxiliar de Ferrocarriles. CAF's bid was slightly higher than that of AnsaldoBreda, and thus Miami-Dade was prepared to award the contract to the former. However, the contract was stalled when CAF filed a lawsuit against the transit authority, claiming that their selection of AnsladoBreda was due to the fact that the builder was willing to open a local factory in Miami-Dade County to assemble the vehicles. This violation could render the deal ineligible for federal funding.

After reevaluating the bids from the builders, without taking local geographic preference into account, Miami-Dade reaffirmed its selection of AnsaldoBreda, and in November 2012, approved a $313 million purchase of 136 new Metrorail cars from the company. Miami-Dade issued the notice to proceed the following month, with the cars expected to be delivered over the course of several years until 2017. By the time the custom rail-car building facility in Medley was completed in early 2016, AnsaldoBreda had been purchased by Hitachi Rail and the full rollout was pushed back to 2019, beginning gradually from 2017. The first trainset entered service in early December 2017. The delivery of the cars fell behind schedule once again due to flooding at the Hitachi Rail factory in West Plains, Missouri, and in February 2018 it was announced that the final replacement cars would not arrive before 2020. The shortage of replacement cars resulted in some Metrorail runs being operated as two-car trains.

Fares and services

As of October 1, 2013, the current standard fare on Metrorail is $2.25 and reduced fare is $1.10. A standard monthly pass costs $112.50 and $56.25 for reduced fare. The monthly Easy Cards are sold at over 50 sales outlets. Reduced fares are available only to Medicare recipients, people with disabilities, and Miami-Dade students in grades 1 through 12. Ticket vending machines (TVMs) that sell Easy Cards and Easy Tickets are found in all rail stations. All Miami-Dade senior citizens aged 65 years and older and with Social Security benefits, and veterans residing in Miami-Dade and earning less than $22,000 annually ride free with the reduced fare monthly Easy Card. All of the stations except the five in the downtown area and Tri-Rail station have dedicated parking available. Parking costs $4.50 per day or $11.50 for a monthly pass.

On July 16, 2008, Miami-Dade Transit announced that it would be replacing all fare collection methods with the Easy Card system by late 2009. The system replaces the old cash and token-based system with one that automatically deducts fares at Metrorail fare gates from a reloadable card. The final station to start fare gate installation was Government Center on August 2, 2009. Since the system launch on October 1, 2009, all passengers using Metrorail must use either an Easy Card or Easy Ticket to enter stations. For almost the full first year of use, the Easy Card ticket vending machines allowed anyone to purchase thousands of dollars worth of Easy Cards by credit card without entering a PIN or billing zip code, which led to credit card thieves putting high dollar values on Easy Cards and selling them at a discounted rate for cash. Miami-Dade Transit initially mitigated this issue by limiting credit card transactions to three per day and a value limit of $112, and later by requiring zip code verification for all cards.

From 2009 to 2011, free Wi-Fi was added to Metrorail and Metromover cars and stations, as well as certain Metrobus routes.

Starting July 28, 2012, Metrorail increased service along shared Green and Orange Line stations from Dadeland South to Earlington Heights. Along this stretch of shared track, trains arrive every 5 minutes during peak hours, every 7 minutes during mid-day hours, and every 15 minutes late nights and on weekends. At stations with only one service, trains arrive every 10 minutes during weekday rush hours, every 15 minutes at midday, and every 15–30 minutes after 6 p.m. until midnight with weekend service running every 30 minutes. Metrorail runs from 5 a.m. until midnight seven days a week. For a brief period from 2003 to April 2004 there was 24-hour service supported by the transit tax; between midnight and 5 a.m. trains arrived every 60 minutes.

A limited-stop bus route, Route 500 Midnight Owl, operates hourly between 12:30 a.m. and 5:30 a.m. trip between Dadeland South and Government Center Metrorail stations. This bus service replaces the 24-hour Metrorail service cancelled due to a lack of ridership.

Construction on the first segment of the Orange Line, Metrorail's AirportLink began in May 2009; service to Miami International Airport began in the summer of 2012.

In August 21st, 2019, Miami-Dade Transit launched contactless payments acceptance on the Metrorail which enabled transit riders to use their smartphone devices (Apple Pay, Google Pay, Samsung Pay), as well as smart watches (Apple Pay, Google Pay, Samsung Pay, Fitbit Pay) to tap and go at all stations. Fare gates were updated instead of replaced to save money. Currently Miami-Dade Transit doesn't allow Express Transit Mode on iOS. The company behind the fare systems is Cubic Transportation Systems, a partner with MDT since the beginning of the Easy Card/Ticket implementation.

MetroPath / The Underline

Beneath the Metrorail guideway from Brickell to Dadeland South, along the former Florida East Coast Railway right-of-way, there is a nearly contiguous  bicycle and pedestrian trail known as the MetroPath (M-Path) which was built in 1984 along with the metro system. It is popular among cyclists, some of whom use it to commute to and from downtown, as well as runners. 

In 2014, plans were made to revamp the MetroPath as a linear park, taking after the popular High Line in New York City, by a group known as "Friends of the GreenLink. The University of Miami assisted in the procurement of the idea. Into 2015, the proposal gained momentum and rebranded itself as [Friends of] "The Underline".  The full park will be completed in phases and will be fully complete in 2025.

Stations

Metrorail currently operates 23 stations, and combined with the Metromover in Downtown Miami and Brickell, the entire Metro system operates 43 stations. Metrorail stations are located at about a mile (one and a half kilometer) apart along the line, and Metromover stations are located at approximately every two blocks in the greater Downtown area.

Current stations
Travel times provided are approximate for travel to and from Government Center in Downtown.

Proposed expansions

From the beginning, the Metrorail was designed and envisioned to have more lines than the current two line system; however, the federally subsidized cost of the original line ended up over budget at $1.02 billion, after which ridership was much lower than expected. The proposed lines included:

The  Biscayne/Northeast Corridor following U.S. Route 1 (Biscayne Boulevard) from Government Center up to the Broward/Miami-Dade county line in Aventura.
The  North Corridor up NW 27 Avenue to the county line.
The  East–West Corridor from Government Center west to the Florida International University main campus in University Park, as well as east from Government Center to the Port of Miami.
The  BayLink from Historic Overtown/Lyric Theater station to South Beach, Miami Beach.
The South Link, a  extension of the Green Line from Dadeland South to Florida City.
The  Douglas Road extension from Douglas Road station to the Miami Intermodal Center.
The  (West) Kendall Corridor down Kendall Drive from Dadeland North station west to West Kendall and north to the FIU main campus.

However, after budget deficits, other uses of the tax revenue, and a downgrade of the North Corridor's funding priority to medium-low by the federal government, after 10 years only the 2.4 mile AirportLink and Orange Line remained promised and realized.

The credibility of Miami-Dade Transit and the County as a whole, including the validity of their ridership estimates and revenue forecasts, has been a significant impediment to their qualifications for funding under the Federal Transit Administration's (FTA) approval. In 2011, Miami-Dade Transit underwent a serious federal investigation and takeover by the FTA in which it was forced to open its books over suspicions of money mismanagement. The Agency threatened to cease its funding used to cover operational costs, which would have meant significant cuts in service; however, they took the funding under their strict control to prevent this from happening.

The South Link expansion, which was intended to replace the South Miami-Dade Busway, a bus rapid transit that opened in segments on February 3, 1997 and in April 2005, had plans for a widened right of way, elevated crossings at major intersections, as well as the possibility of building one additional Metrorail station at SW 104 Street to alleviate traffic and parking in Dadeland. In 2009, the Metropolitan Planning Organization proposed that the busway be opened to regular vehicle traffic by adding a SunPass toll system with the profits going towards busway improvements. The proposal did not pass. The South Link, now known as the South-Dade Transitway Corridor, is currently an under construction gold standard bus rapid transit line with an expected start of revenue service in March 2024.

On November 16, 2022, Miami-Dade County announced that they would accelerate construction on the North Corridor along NW 27th Avenue from Dr. Martin Luther King Jr. Plaza station to Hard Rock Stadium at NW 199th Street in Miami Gardens, Florida, with a goal of starting construction in 2024 with aid from federal funds. The extension will be built in two phases: Phase I would see the extension built up to Hard Rock Stadium with just one station, while Phase II would see more stations built on the elevated line as well as transit-oriented developments built alongside it.

Ridership
Sortable chart detailing monthly weekday ridership averages by calendar year; right hand chart giving annual averages may use "fiscal year" without disclosure, where the FY begins in October and has 75% of its time in the next year with only 25% in the starting year. Note the large jump in ridership starting September 2012 after the Orange Line extension to MIA opened, the largest project that came to fruition after the passing of the half-penny tax in 2002. Service frequency below Earlington Heights was doubled as a result, hence the ridership jumped by nearly 10,000, at least four times the ridership of the single new station at the Miami Intermodal Center (< 2,000). Year averages are rounded to the nearest 500, and the highest month is also given in bold. A trend of lower ridership during the summer can be seen, when the traffic and population of the county (and state) is generally lower. The low December ridership anomaly may be explained by the long Christmas and holiday season. By 2016, ridership started to decrease, especially by summer, where July saw the lowest ridership since the Orange Line opened in 2012. This lag follows Metrobus, which began to decline in 2014, amid an aging fleet and falling oil and gas prices, and posted the lowest ridership numbers in over a decade during June and July 2016. For October 2016, even Metromover recorded low ridership, though the low numbers for this specific month were blamed on one day of closure for Hurricane Matthew. 2017 saw a continuation in the ridership decline across all three systems; ridership in September 2017 was impacted by Hurricane Irma despite the exclusion of days without service from the average. All three modes declined sharply starting in March 2020 during the covid pandemic, slowly recovering over the next three years. 

* Record high

Ridership records

See also
Transportation in South Florida
List of metro systems
List of United States rapid transit systems by ridership
List of North American rapid transit systems by ridership
List of Florida railroads

Notes

References

Further reading

External links

 
 

 
Rapid transit in Florida
1984 establishments in Florida
Railway lines opened in 1984
Transportation in South Florida
750 V DC railway electrification
Railway lines opened in 2012